Helmstedtisuchus is an extinct genus of fish. Fossils have been found from Helmstedt, Germany that are late Eocene in age. The genus was originally thought to be a eusuchian crocodylomorph, but it is now known to have been a scombrid teleostean fish.

References

Scombridae
Eocene fish of Europe